Moraña is a municipality in Galicia, Spain in the province of Pontevedra.

See also 

 Lapa de Gargantáns

References

Municipalities in the Province of Pontevedra